Carmen Damedoz née Marie Élise Provost (17 May 1890 - 14 May 1964) was a French dancer, artist's model and aviator, earning pilot's licence No. 1449 from the Aéro-club de France on 22 August 1913.

Early life 
Marie Élise Provost was born on 17 May 1890 in the 14th arrondissement of Paris, daughter of Richard Provost, a civil engineer specialising in earthworks, and Marie Louise Dirant, a housewife.

Career - dancer and artists model 
She adopted the Hispanic-sounding pseudonym Carmen Damedoz - her complexion and black hair may have suggested she was Spanish- and became known as a dancer, sometimes wearing a Spanish costume or shawl. She became the model for several artists including Antoine Bourdelle, Alberto Giacometti and Auguste Rodin to whom she became close, writing to him: J'attends quelques lignes du dieu de la sculpture dont j'adore le talent et l'embrasse de mon plus long baiser... Bien à vous corps et âme. (I await a few lines from the god of sculpture, whose talent I adore, and kiss him with my longest kiss... Yours body and soul).

Flying 
In May 1911, in Issy-les-Moulineaux, Carmen Damedoz attended the start of the Paris-Rome-Turin air race, organised by Le Petit Parisien, and discovered her vocation as a pilot. In the following months she learned to fly aeroplanes at the Vidamée aerodrome, near Courteuil, and earned her pilot's licence on 22 August 1913, in a Sommer biplane.

Her test flight was not easy: during her first eight, the 25 hp engine lost power and the aircraft slid to the ground, causing slight damage and resulting in two broken ribs. For her second attempt, she flew a Sommer with a 50 hp engine and passed her test with flying colours. She was the last woman to pass the flying test before the outbreak of the First World War, She joined of la Stella (Aéroclub Féminine la Stella), which had been set up by Marie Surcouf to bring together female sports pilots.

In December 1913, at the controls of a Gnome-Saulnier monoplane equipped with a 50 hp engine, her engine failed, but she won the gold medal for the women's altitude prize, offered by Senator Émile Reymond, by reaching  or  depending on the source. This flight lasted 38 minutes and took place at the Vidamée aerodrome. The magazine L'Aérophile described her as one of the best known aviatrixes of her time, with exceptional energy and tenacity.

First World War 
At the beginning of the war, she was keen to be mobilised and placed at the disposal of the ministre de la Guerre with her aircraft, but was not called upon. As treasurer of the Union patriotique des aviatrices de France, alongside Marthe Richer - its secretary, she demanded the right to contribute to the war effort as an aviator. But the military authorities refused to allow their participation.

Post war 
In 1922, she was photographed naked next to a fully clothed Alberto Giacometti in the studio of the Académie de la Grande-Chaumière, by Marion Walton, an American student at the school.

Personal life 
According to marginal notes on her birth certificate, she married Prosper Jean Henri Maurice Berger, an aviator, in Paris in 1919, and divorced him three years later. She then married Émile Léon Camus on 7 October 1922, in Pougny, Nièvre. But these marginal mentions were cancelled by two judgments of 1924, transcribed in 1931, indicating that her marriage to Émile Léon Camus actually dated from 20 May 1914. She remained married to him until his death.

Marie Élise Provost died on 14 May 1964 at her home at 227 avenue Gambetta in the 20th arrondissement of Paris. She was buried five days later in the Parisian cemetery of Saint-Ouen.

Bibliography 
 Françoise Chapart, «Un passé tout récent et déjà oublié: les aviateurs de la Vidamée», Comptes rendus et mémoires, Société d'histoire et d’archéologie de Senlis, 1977, pp. 49–62

References

External links
 Mlle Carmen Damedoz photograph published in L'Aérophile, 1 March 1914, p. 118
 Marion Walton, Alberto Giacometti et le modèle Carmen Damedoz photograph, 1922, Marion Walton papers, 1915–1976. Archives of American Art, Smithsonian Institution
 Mme Damedoz, aviatrice postcard, no date

1890 births
1964 deaths
French women aviators
People from Paris
French aviators
Artists' models
French artists' models
French dancers